Grier William "Skipper" Friday (October 26, 1897 – August 25, 1962) was a Major League Baseball pitcher who played for the Washington Senators in .

External links

1897 births
1962 deaths
Major League Baseball pitchers
Baseball players from North Carolina
People from Gastonia, North Carolina
Nashville Vols players